Richard of Ilchester (died 22 December 1188) was a medieval English statesman and prelate.

Life

Richard was born in the diocese of Bath, where he obtained preferment. Early in the reign of Henry II, however, he is found acting as a clerk in the King's court, probably under Thomas Becket, and he was one of the officials who assisted Henry in carrying out his great judicial and financial reforms. Richard was the first King's Remembrancer, the oldest judicial office still in existence in England, in 1154.

In 1162, or 1163, Richard was appointed archdeacon of Poitiers, but he passed most of his time in England, although in the next two or three years he visited Pope Alexander III and the Emperor Frederick I in the interests of the English king. He was one of the persons whom the Constitutions of Clarendon were addressed, along with Geoffrey Ridel and Richard de Luci. For promising to support Frederick against Alexander he was excommunicated by Becket in 1166. Before this event, however, Richard had been appointed a baron of the exchequer. One of Richard's duties was to oversee the making of the Pipe rolls, as well as keeping the treasurer from falling asleep. He also was responsible for an innovation in record keeping by the Exchequer, ordering a record kept of every summons made by the Exchequer. This system, however, was discontinued later.

Although totally immersed in secular business Richard received several rich ecclesiastical offices including treasurer of the diocese of Poitiers, and 1 May 1173 he was elected bishop of Winchester, being consecrated at Canterbury in October 1174. Richard still continued to serve Henry II. In 1176 he was appointed justiciary and seneschal of Normandy, and was given full control of all the royal business in the duchy. He died on 22 December 1188, and was buried in Winchester Cathedral. Richard owes his surname to the fact that Henry II granted him a mill at Ilchester.

While bishop Richard gave an endowment to a hospital in Winchester, and allowed it to double the number of poor that it fed.

Richard probably was the father of the brothers Richard Poore, who became Bishop of Durham, and Herbert Poore, who became Bishop of Salisbury.

Notes

Citations

References
 British History Online Bishops of Salisbury accessed on 30 October 2007
 British History Online Bishops of Winchester accessed on 2 November 2007
 
 
 
 

English theologians
Bishops of Winchester
12th-century English Roman Catholic bishops
1188 deaths
People temporarily excommunicated by the Catholic Church
People from Bath, Somerset
Year of birth unknown
People from Ilchester, Somerset